The 7th National Congress of the Kuomintang was the seventh national congress of the Kuomintang (KMT), held on 10–20 October 1952 at Taipei, Taiwan. This was the first KMT National Congress in Taiwan, formerly a Japanese territory until 1952, after KMT lost Mainland China to the Chinese Communist Party in the Chinese Civil War.

Results
The congress announced the completion of the 2 years party reform.

See also
 Kuomintang

References

1952 conferences
1952 in Taiwan
National Congresses of the Kuomintang
October 1952 events in Asia
Politics of Taiwan